This is a complete list of New York State Historic Markers in Genesee County, New York.

Listings county-wide

See also
List of New York State Historic Markers
National Register of Historic Places listings in New York
List of National Historic Landmarks in New York

References

Genesee County, New York
Genessee